Bronidox, or 5-bromo-5-nitro-1,3-dioxane, is an antimicrobial chemical compound.

Bronidox causes inhibition of enzyme activity in bacteria.

Bronidox is corrosive to metals.

Uses 
 Bactericide
 Fungicide, effective against yeast and other fungi
 It is used in immunology for preserving antibodies and antisera in 0.1 - 0.5% concentration. It is used as preservative to avoid use of sodium azide.
 Stabilizer
 Surfactant
 Used in cosmetics since the mid-1970s as preservative for shampoos, foam bath, etc. Maximum concentration is 0.1%.
 Some users do not recommend use in preparations destined for in vivo or tissue culture work

See also 
 Bronopol

References 

Organobromides
Dioxanes
Nitro compounds